Andrew Bisnaught (born July 6, 1980), better known by his stage name DJ Babey Drew, is an American DJ, Grammy winning record producer, actor, radio and television personality. He is a DJ for Atlanta-based radio station Power 96.1. He is also known from the VH1 reality show, Love & Hip Hop: Atlanta and the movie Push in which he plays Delroy.

Filmography

Film

Television

References

1980 births
American DJs
Living people
Participants in American reality television series
American radio hosts